The 1994–95 Eastern Counties Football League season was the 53rd in the history of Eastern Counties Football League a football competition in England.

Premier Division

The Premier Division featured 20 clubs which competed in the division last season, along with two new clubs, promoted from Division One:
Hadleigh United
Woodbridge Town

League table

Division One

Division One featured 16 clubs which competed in the division last season, along with three new clubs:
Gorleston, relegated from the Premier Division
King's Lynn reserves
Norwich United, relegated from the Premier Division

League table

References

External links
 Eastern Counties Football League

1994-95
1994–95 in English football leagues